Rafael Rangel is one of the 20 municipalities of the state of Trujillo, Venezuela. The municipality occupies an area of 120 km2 with a population of 22,153 inhabitants according to the 2011 census.

Parishes
The municipality consists of the following four parishes:

Betijoque
José Gregorio Hernánde
La Pueblita
Los Cedros

References

Municipalities of Trujillo (state)